Thor Scherffenberg With was a Norwegian bishop and theologian in the Church of Norway.  He was bishop of the Diocese of Bjørgvin from 1977 until 1987.

Thor With was born on 14 January 1918 in the village of Honningsvåg in Nordkapp Municipality in far northern Norway.  He received his cand.theol. degree in 1943 and was ordained as a priest in 1946.  He completed further studies of the Northern Sami language in 1950 from the University of Oslo.

With served as the acting parish priest in Narvik from 1947 until 1949.  He then was an assistant priest at Tromsø Cathedral from 1949–1950.  In 1950 he became the rector of the Sami folk high school in Karasjok, a position he held until 1957.  He next was the parish priest in Tana from 1957 until 1961.  In 1961 he became the secretary general of the Norwegian Sami Mission.  In 1968 he left Northern Norway and became the head chaplain at the Deaconess Hospital in Oslo, where he stayed until 1975.  In 1975, he became the Dean of Nidaros Cathedral in Trondheim.  Then in 1977, he succeeded Per Juvkam as the new bishop of the Diocese of Bjørgvin, based in the city of Bergen.  He retired in 1987.

With died on 5 June 1997 at the age of 79.

References

1918 births
1997 deaths
People from Nordkapp
University of Oslo alumni
Bishops of Bjørgvin
20th-century Lutheran bishops